Fritz Theodor Carl von Below (23 September 1853 – 23 November 1918) was a Prussian general in the German Army during the First World War. He commanded troops during the Battle of the Somme, the Second Battle of the Aisne, and the German spring offensive in 1918.

Biography

Born in Danzig (Gdańsk), Below was appointed to the command of XXI Corps in 1912. In this capacity, he fought along with the 6th Army on the Western Front at the beginning of World War I.  His corps was transferred in 1915 to the Eastern Front where it participated in the Second Battle of the Masurian Lakes.  Below was awarded the Pour le Mérite on 16 February 1915 for successful campaigns on the Western Front and in the Second Battle of the Masurian Lakes.

Below was elevated to command of the 2nd Army on 4 April 1915. In 1916 the 2nd Army bore the brunt of the Allied attack in the  Battle of the Somme. Reinforcements increased the size of the 2nd Army to such an extent that a decision was made to split it. The 1st Army was reformed on 19 July 1916 from the right (northern) wing of the 2nd Army.  Below took command of 1st Army and 2nd Army got a new commander General der Artillerie Max von Gallwitz, who was also installed as commander of armeegruppe Gallwitz-Somme to co-ordinate the actions of both armies.  Below was awarded the Oakleaves to the Pour le Mérite (signifying a second award) on 11 August 1916 for his success in operations during the Battle of the Somme.

Below was appointed to command the 9th Army in June 1918, still on the Western Front. Below had contracted pneumonia and its former commander, General der Infanterie Johannes von Eben, remained in provisional command.

Below died in Weimar on 23 November 1918, shortly after Germany had signed the armistice. He is buried in the Invalidenfriedhof Cemetery in Berlin.

Family
Below was the cousin of Otto von Below, another German commander during the war. The two generals are often confused.

Glossary 
 Armee-Abteilung or Army Detachment in the sense of "something detached from an Army".  It is not under the command of an Army so is in itself a small Army.
 Armee-Gruppe or Army Group in the sense of a group within an Army and under its command, generally formed as a temporary measure for a specific task.
 Heeresgruppe or Army Group in the sense of a number of armies under a single commander.

See also
 List of people from Danzig

References

Bibliography

External links

1853 births
1918 deaths
Burials at the Invalids' Cemetery
German Army generals of World War I
Military personnel from Gdańsk
People from the Province of Prussia
Generals of Infantry (Prussia)
Recipients of the Pour le Mérite (military class)
Fritz
Honorary Knights Grand Cross of the Royal Victorian Order